Hopp is a surname. Notable people with the surname include:

 Ceci Hopp (born c. 1963), American track and field athlete
 Dietmar Hopp (born 1940), German entrepreneur
 Doris Hopp (1930–1998), Swedish brothel madam
 Hanns Hopp (1890–1971), German architect
 Johnny Hopp (1916–2003), American baseball player
 Karl-Heinz Hopp (1936–2007), German rower
 Kristof Hopp (born 1978), German badminton player
 Lisa Hopp (born 1956), American academic
 Max Hopp (born 1996), German darts player 
 Odd Hopp (1913-2001), Norwegian Scout leader
 Zinken Hopp (1905–1987), Norwegian writer

See also
 Hoppe (disambiguation)
 Hopps (surname)